"Doctor Pressure" is a song by Mylo and Miami Sound Machine, from the re-issue of Mylo's debut studio album Destroy Rock & Roll (2004). The song was written by Elias Enrique Garcia and the producer Mylo. It was released by Sony BMG and Breastfed Recordings on 5 September 2005, as the sixth single from the album. Initially created as a bootleg recording by Phil 'N' Dog, the mashup contains a sample of the songs "Drop the Pressure" and "Dr. Beat" by Mylo and Miami Sound Machine respectively.

"Doctor Pressure" peaked at number three on the UK Singles Chart, number five on the Irish Singles Chart, and at number 12 on the Australian ARIA Singles Chart. An accompanying music video was directed by Hexstatic member Stuart Warren Hill and released in 2005, which uses a DVJ to scratch and insert footage. The video is considered to be one of the first official mashup videos, while the song was later sampled by One Bit and Noah Cyrus on "My Way".

Background and release
Mylo released the electro song "Drop the Pressure" in October 2004, which was included on his debut studio album Destroy Rock & Roll (2004). During its production, Mylo used Reason 2.5 to incorporate a vocoder module in the song. Phil 'N' Dog released a bootleg recording titled "Doctor Pressure" that spliced "Drop the Pressure" with Miami Sound Machine's 1984 song "Dr. Beat", which Mylo then made minor alterations to the song. "Doctor Pressure" was written by Elias Enrique Garcia and the producer Mylo, while it was mastered by John Davis at Alchemy Soho. The song contains a sample of "Dr. Beat", which is included in a mashup with "Drop the Pressure".

"Doctor Pressure" was released as the sixth single from the re-issue of Destroy Rock N Roll on 5 September 2005, which included three new songs. Both Sony BMG and Breastfed Recordings believed that the song would introduce the album to a wider audience. Writing for the National Post in 2007, Maryam Siddiqi stated that fans of the dance genre would "[clap] their hands for more" mashups such as "Doctor Pressure".

Commercial performance
"Doctor Pressure" debuted at the number three peak on the UK Singles Chart dated 11 September 2005, with 19,881 copies sold in the first week. The song subsequently peaked higher than both "Dr. Beat" and "Drop the Pressure" on the chart, and remained for 26 weeks. It was eventually certified silver by the British Phonographic Industry (BPI) on 22 July 2013, for track-equivalent sales of 200,000 units. In the Republic of Ireland, "Doctor Pressure" debuted on the Irish Singles Chart dated 8 September 2005. The song bowed at number five and remained on the chart for 11 weeks. It additionally debuted at the number five peak on the Scottish Singles Chart dated 11 September 2005. On the Australian ARIA Singles Chart dated 11 June 2005, "Doctor Pressure" bowed at number 12, where it remained for 11 weeks.

Music video and legacy
An accompanying music video was released in 2005 and directed by Stuart Warren Hill of English electronic music duo Hexstatic. Warren Hill utilized a DVJ to scratch sections, with the footage inserted in the video's cut. Chris Mugan of The Independent acknowledged that it is "one of the first officially sanctioned mash-up visuals" along with Addictive TV's video for "Rapture Riders", a mashup of Blondie's 1981 song "Rapture" and the Doors' 1971 song "Riders on the Storm". In 2017, British duo One Bit and American singer Noah Cyrus sampled "Doctor Pressure" on the song "My Way", which consequently sampled "Drop the Pressure" too. Writing for The Fader, Owen Myers stated that Cyrus' "full-bodied" vocals modernised "Drop the Pressure".

Track listings

UK CD single 1
 "Doctor Pressure" (Clean Radio Edit) 3:24
 "Drop the Pressure" (Clean Radio Edit) 3:14

UK CD single 2
Australian maxi single (released 26 September 2005)
 "Doctor Pressure" (Dirty Radio Edit) 3:26
 "Doctor Pressure" (Dirty Club Mix) 5:40
 "Drop the Pressure" (Club Mix) 5:14
 "Drop the Pressure" (Rex the Dog Remix) 7:03
 "Drop the Pressure" (Stanton Warriors Remix) 4:47

German maxi single (released 9 December 2005)
 "Doctor Pressure" (Dirty Radio Edit) 3:24
 "Doctor Pressure" (Clean Radio Edit) 3:24
 "Doctor Pressure" (Clean Club Mix) 5:39
 "Doctor Pressure" (Dirty Club Mix) 5:39

Credits and personnel
Credits adapted from the back cover of "Doctor Pressure".

Recording
 Contains a sample of "Dr. Beat" by Miami Sound Machine featuring Gloria Estefan
 Mastered at Alchemy Soho
 "Doctor Pressure" was originally conceived by Phil 'N' Dog

Personnel
 Myles MacInnes producing, mixing, arranging
 Elias Enrique Garcia songwriting
 John Davis mastering

Charts and certifications

Weekly charts

Year-end charts

Certifications

References

2004 songs
2005 singles
Gloria Estefan songs
Mashup songs
Mylo songs
Sony BMG singles
Songs written by Enrique Garcia (songwriter)
Songs written by Mylo